Three deadly tornadoes impacted Wisconsin and Michigan on September 26, 1951. Both tornadoes in Wisconsin were violent while the one in Michigan was also significant. Eight people were killed, 15 others were injured, and damages were estimated at $750,000.

Meteorological synopsis
On September 23, a low-pressure area formed in the Southern Alaska panhandle. This low tracked southeastward for just over a day before turning and accelerating eastward, moving through British Columbia and crossing the international border into Montana, while another low pressure wave formed over extreme southwestern South Dakota from a small frontal wave. These lows moved in tandem and deepened rapidly as they moved into Minnesota on September 26. The northern low then rapidly weakened and dissipated as the southern one occluded and became dominant as it moved into northwestern Wisconsin that afternoon. An occluded front came off the low pressure area and split into cold and warm fronts with the former stretching southwestward into Kansas while the later moved into Southern Lower Michigan. With temperatures ranging from the lower 60s to the upper 70s, dewpoint temperatures ranging from the mid 50s to upper 60s, and upper-level wind shear of up to 65 knots, the environment was favorable for the development of thunderstorms, sparking a severe weather outbreak.

Confirmed tornadoes

September 26 event

Non-tornadic impacts
In the early morning hours of September 26, lightning heavily damaged three homes and destroyed two barns in Bettendorf, Iowa and Northern Illinois with one barn in the latter state completely burning. Most of Northern Illinois also saw considerable damage due to heavy rainfall. In Wisconsin, high winds of over  blew down trees and damaged power lines and buildings. Piers and docks on Lake Michigan, which was higher than normal for that time of year, were damaged by waves. Similar damage was seen in Michigan, where the apple harvest suffered thousands of dollars in losses. Lake shore properties along Lake Michigan and Lake Huron, which was also higher than normal, were damaged by high waves with Frankfort, DeTour, Escanaba, and the Western Lake Huron shores being particularly hard hit.

See also
 List of North American tornadoes and tornado outbreaks
 List of F4 and EF4 tornadoes

Notes

References

External links
 Waupaca, WI F4 Tornado
 Waupaca, WI F4 Tornado – September 26, 1951 Published by Jen Narramore on September 26, 2019

Tornadoes of 1951
F4 tornadoes
Tornadoes in Wisconsin
Tornadoes in Michigan